Fred Petersen is a Samoan former professional rugby league footballer who played in the 1990s and 2000s.  Petersen also represented Samoa in the 2000 World Cup.

Playing career
Petersen played for the Penrith Panthers between 1996 and 2001, playing in 15 National Rugby League matches. He played for the Junior Kiwis in 1997. In 2000 he was named in the Samoan squad for the World Cup. During the first match against Ireland he was concussed and he did not play in another match in the competition.

He joined the Sydney City Roosters in 2003 and played in two first grade matches for the club. In 2004 he joined the Parramatta Eels but spent the season in the NSWRL Premier League.

References

Living people
Samoan rugby league players
Samoa national rugby league team players
1978 births
Rugby league wingers
Penrith Panthers players
Sydney Roosters players
Junior Kiwis players
Samoan emigrants to New Zealand
Samoan expatriate rugby league players
Expatriate rugby league players in Australia
Samoan expatriate sportspeople in Australia